Van Valckenborch was a Flemish family of painters active in the late 16th and early 17th century. Notable members of the family include:

Frederik van Valckenborch
Gillis van Valckenborch
Marten van Valckenborch (1535–1612)
Lucas van Valckenborch

Surnames of Dutch origin